Notoungulata is an extinct order of mammalian ungulates that inhabited South America from the early Paleocene to the Holocene, living from approximately 61 million to 11,000 years ago. Notoungulates were morphologically diverse, with forms resembling animals as disparate as rabbits and rhinoceroses. Notoungulata are the largest group of South American native ungulates, with over 150 genera in 14 families having been described, divided into two major subgroupings, Typotheria and Toxodontia. Notoungulates first diversified during the Eocene. Their diversity declined during the Late Neogene, with only the large toxodontids persisting until the end of the Pleistocene. Collagen analysis suggests that notoungulates are closely related to litopterns, another group of South American ungulates, and their closest living relatives being perissodactyls (odd-toed ungulates), including rhinoceroses, tapirs and equines. but their relationships to other South American ungulates are uncertain. Several groups of notoungulates separately evolved ever-growing cheek teeth.

Taxonomy 

Notoungulata is divided into two major suborders, Typotheria and Toxodontia, alongside some basal groups (Notostylopidae and Henricosborniidae) which are potentially paraphyletic. Due to the isolated nature of South America, many notoungulates evolved along convergent lines into forms that resembled mammals on other continents. Examples of this are Pachyrukhos, a notoungulate that filled an ecological niche similar to those of rabbits and hares, and Homalodotherium, which resembled chalicotheres. The families Interatheriidae, Hegetotheriidae, Mesotheriidae and Toxodontidae separately evolved high crowned (hypsodont) ever-growing cheek teeth. During the Pleistocene, Toxodon was the largest common notoungulate. Most of the group (Mixotoxodon, Piauhytherium and Toxodon being exceptions) became extinct after the landbridge between North and South America formed and allowed North American ungulates to enter South America in the Great American Interchange, and then to out-compete the native fauna. Mixotoxodon was the only member of the group to be successful in invading Central America and southern North America, reaching as far north as Texas.

This order is united with other South American ungulates in the super-order Meridiungulata. The notoungulate and litoptern native ungulates of South America have been shown by studies of collagen and mitochondrial DNA sequences to be a sister group to the perissodactyls, making them true ungulates. The estimated divergence date is 66 million years ago. This conflicts with the results of some morphological analyses which posited them as afrotherians. It is in line with some more recent morphological analyses which suggested they were basal euungulates. Panperissodactyla has been proposed as the name of an unranked clade to include perissodactyls and their extinct South American ungulate relatives.

Cifelli has argued that Notioprogonia is paraphyletic, as it would include the ancestors of the remaining suborders. Similarly, Cifelli indicated that Typotheria would be paraphyletic if it excluded Hegetotheria and he advocated inclusion of Archaeohyracidae and Hegetotheriidae in Typotheria.

Notoungulata were for many years taken to include the order Arctostylopida, whose fossils are found mainly in China. Recent studies, however, have concluded that Arctostylopida are more properly classified as gliriforms, and that the notoungulates were therefore never found outside South and Central America.

Based on an analysis of 133 morphological characters in 50 notoungulate genera, Billet in 2011 concluded that Homalodotheriidae, Leontiniidae, Toxodontidae, Interatheriidae, Mesotheriidae, and Hegetotheriidae are the only monophyletic families of notoungulates.

Phylogeny

Orders and families
Order Notoungulata - notoungulates
Suborder Notioprogonia
Family Henricosborniidae
Family Notostylopidae
Suborder Toxodontia
Family Isotemnidae
Family Leontiniidae
Family Notohippidae
Family Toxodontidae
Family Homalodotheriidae
Suborder Typotheria
Family Archaeohyracidae
Family Archaeopithecidae
Family Campanorcidae
Family Hegetotheriidae
Family Interatheriidae
Family Mesotheriidae
Family Oldfieldthomasiidae

References

Bibliography

Further reading 
 
 
 

 
Paleocene mammals
Miocene mammals of South America
Oligocene mammals
Pleistocene mammals
Ungulates
Paleocene first appearances
Pleistocene extinctions
Fossil taxa described in 1903
Pliocene notoungulates
Mammal orders